Eco-sufficiency, or simply sufficiency, refers to the concept or strategy to reduce the environmental footprint of societies through moderating the need for energy, carbon and material-based services and products. The term was popularised by authors such as Thomas Princen, a professor at MIT, in his 2005 book ‘The Logic of Sufficiency’. As a goal, sufficiency is about ensuring that all humans can live a good life without overshooting the ecological limits of the Earth, while at the same time defining what that good life may consist of. Princen argues that ‘seeking enough when more is possible is both intuitive and rational - personally, organizationally and ecologically. And under global ecological constraint, it is ethical.' 

In order to operationalise sufficiency, principles and ideas of concrete actions and policies have been proposed by various authors. Sufficiency may be approached at the individual level as a personal attitude or life philosophy (such as in the ‘Sobriété heureuse’ concept of French environmentalist Pierre Rabhi, or Schneidewind‘s concept of the ‘Good Life’), as well as a core collective value that could amend the notion of liberal societies. In terms of lifestyles, it is strongly related to the concepts of voluntary simplicity and downshifting.

There are significant barriers to the widespread adoption of sufficiency, as it goes against current dominant social paradigms (economic growth focus, materialism, individualism, etc.). However, there are signs of change in some trends, be they motivated by environmental concerns or other co-benefits. Sufficiency usually triggers debates around the notions of needs, wants, and 'enoughness'. Its impact on the economy and the role of rebound effects are also challenges to be addressed.

The war in Ukraine and subsequent energy crisis in 2022 have put a significant pressure on energy supply, notably in Europe, and popularised the concept of sufficiency and sufficiency policies. For instance, France has published a national energy sufficiency plan in October 2022 ('Plan national de sobriété énergétique').

 Background 
 Definitions 
Sufficiency (also called ‘eco-sufficiency’) is a concept that relates both to an ideal and a strategy to achieve it.

As a goal, sufficiency is about ensuring that all humans can live a good life without overshooting the ecological limits of the Earth (for now and generations to come), and defining what that good life may be made of.

As an increasing number of experts consider that technical progress and greener technologies alone will not be enough to achieve this goal, sufficiency also designates the societal transformations (in terms of lifestyles, social practices, infrastructures, etc.) that will be necessary to bring production and consumption patterns to a level compatible with the goal. It raises the question of individual and social limitations on these current patterns, building in particular on a sense of ‘enoughness’.

The term sufficiency has been popularised by Thomas Princen’s book ‘The Logic of Sufficiency’ published in 2005, in which he argues that ‘seeking enough when more is possible is both intuitive and rational - personally, organizationally and ecologically. And under global ecological constraint, it is ethical.’

Sufficiency may be approached at individual level as a personal attitude or life philosophy (such as in the ‘Sobriété heureuse’ concept of French environmentalist Pierre Rabhi, or Schneidewind‘s concept of the ‘Good Life’), as well as a core collective value that could amend the notion of liberal societies.

Sufficiency can be interpreted and discussed in virtually all social settings and economic sectors. In terms of lifestyles, it is strongly related to the concepts of voluntary simplicity and downshifting.

 Energy sufficiency 
The concept of sufficiency has been primarily developed in the area of energy consumption, where levels of greenhouse gas emissions far exceed what the planet may absorb and “rapid, far-reaching and unprecedented changes in all aspects of society” are necessary according to IPCC.

Drawing on the limits of technical efficiency and rebound effects, sufficiency proponents argue that energy demand and its associated emissions cannot be sufficiently reduced if the root causes of this demand are not addressed, that is the nature and level of the energy services our societies rely on.

In that prospect, energy sufficiency is about questioning and drastically reducing energy demand through ‘changes in quantity or quality’ of the energy-based services consumed, notably by ‘favouring behaviours and activities that are intrinsically low on energy use’.

The boundary between efficiency and sufficiency actions are not always precisely set; some authors have a broad conception of efficiency that may include aspects of lifestyle change.

Academic work released in 2022 systematically classified and databased specific public policy measures that can, individually and collectively, contribute to the uptake energy sufficiency.  Contents under Creative Commons CC‑BY‑4.0 licensing.

 Material sufficiency 
Sufficiency is also applicable to material consumption. Similar to energy sufficiency, it consists in reducing demand for services and activities requiring high level of material resources, and favouring intrinsically lean ones. It is for instance associated with the ideas of avoiding wasteful consumption, owning fewer products, and prolonging their lifetimes.

Here also, depending on authors’ definitions, the boundary between efficiency and sufficiency may not always be perfectly drawn. As an illustration, a report for UNEP classifies items such as reducing living spaces, driving smaller cars and car sharing as ‘material efficiency’, while they would be more traditionally viewed as sufficiency.

 Potential impact 
Sufficiency largely remains a blindspot in most established ecological/energy transition scenarios, where efficiency and greener technologies are the main and only strategies usually modelled.

There are exceptions though. The French négaWatt Association has assessed the potential of energy sufficiency at the level of France, through its national négaWatt 2050 scenario. The scenario is based on three principles (sufficiency-efficiency-renewables) with the goal of reaching a factor 2 reduction on energy demand and factor 4 on greenhouse gas emissions by 2050, involving changes in lifestyles and societal organisation considered as reasonable by the modellers. Sufficiency appears to be able to provide more final energy savings than efficiency.

A German study found that sufficiency measures could lead to a theoretical reduction of 70 % of energy consumption at the level of households. The calculation assumes sufficiency measures encompassing the size of appliances (smaller, fewer appliances) as well as in their usage patterns. 

A number of other scenarios and models lead to similar conclusions on the magnitude of saving potentials.

In order to encourage and improve the robustness and visibility of sufficiency modelling in energy scenarios, guidelines and recommendations have been published e.g. by the Ministry of Environment in Germany, or the SHIFT Project in France).

 Implementation 

 Principles 
While several established environmental strategies and policies do not question upstream the need for perpetual growth in energy and material services, sufficiency does. It needs to be translated into implementation principles to challenge current lifestyles and social paradigms. The "Four D's" suggested by Wolfgang Sachs are one example:

 Decelerate (going slower and less far);
 De-clutter (accumulate fewer things);
 Decentralize (choosing local and regional) ;
 Decommercialization (leaving less room for the market).

The discussion about sufficiency principles is not restricted to a particular area or sector, and may relate to broad lifestyle aspects such as quality of life and work-life balance.

Sufficiency, as a strategy, may also be operationalised through distinguishing between different approaches to limiting the need for energy/resource-intensive services:

 Reducing (i.e. consuming less);
 Substituting (replacing highly-consuming services by less intensive ones);
 Better sizing (avoiding oversized services and waste);
 Sharing (optimising the use of each energy/resource-based service).
The sufficiency theory also overlaps with the concept of 'consumption corridors'. This concept emerged notably from a transdisciplinary research program funded by the German Min­istry for Education and Research, entitled “From Knowledge to Action – New Paths towards Sustainable Consumption.” Consumption corridors define a space between what is socially enough (the floor) and environmentally not too much (the ceiling).

 Concrete sufficiency actions 
There are many examples of individual and collective actions and changes that fall under the sufficiency approach. The following (non-exhaustive) list provides some:

 Living and working in smaller (or shared) spaces;
 Moderating internal temperatures in buildings;
 Using more natural rather than artificial light;
 Choosing smaller appliances (or at least commensurate to actual needs);
 Owning and using less (often) appliances and electronic products;
 Sharing equipment between businesses;
 Flying less;
 Favouring low-energy transport modes (walking, cycling…);
 Sharing vehicles;
 Promoting remote work and flextime;
 Prolonging the lifetime of products through repairing, re-using, and fighting obsolescence;
 Refraining from fast fashion;
 Favouring local low-techs over high-techs;
 Switching to vegan and vegetarian diets;
 Buying locally-produced food;
 Avoiding food waste.

 Sufficiency drivers and policies 
One of the main barriers to sufficiency, often put forward by sceptics, is the dominant social paradigm in liberal societies, which currently values material possession, greed, power, individualism, social differentiation through consumption, and other mindsets that conflict with the mentalities that sufficiency requires (temperance, moderation, downsizing, etc.). However, as environmental concerns grow, there are also signs showing the potential beginning of sufficiency trends. Three examples are:

 The growth of cycling for daily trips in an increasing number of cities worldwide;
 The "flight shame" movement in Sweden;
 The reduction of average meat consumption in some countries (e.g. France).

The role of intentionality in sufficiency is debated. While for many authors sufficiency requires (as a starting point) a profound and voluntary reassessment of personal and collective priorities in light of the Earth’s limits, for others, audiences could be ‘nudged’ or persuaded into taking some sufficiency actions without either being engaged with the issue or being primarily motivated by environmental concerns. There appear to be many co-benefits to sufficiency actions that could encourage their uptake, e.g. health and animal welfare for vegetarian diets, air pollution reduction for driving less, children’s health for limiting screen use, biodiversity protection for limiting artificial lights, etc.

There is increasing research into the role of policies in fostering sufficiency, although sufficiency is still in conflict with the ideological orientation of many decision-makers who are reluctant to engage with this idea.

Policies that are viewed as supportive of sufficiency include:

 Energy/resource taxation, especially progressive taxation (at a sufficient level to genuinely trigger behaviour change);
 Personal carbon allowances;
 Phase-out or restrictions on certain highly intensive energy/resource-based services;
 Investments in alternative mobility infrastructures (cycling lanes, etc.);
 Alternative urban planning reducing the need for individual transport means;
 Facilitating building sharing;
 Environmental labelling based on absolute product impacts or progressive indicators (i.e. that become more challenging as product size, capacity or features increases);
 Incentives to encourage sufficiency behaviours and projects, such as financial bonus/malus schemes based on the absolute energy consumption of services;
 Evolutions in public prescriptions (on comfort, lighting, hygiene…) to alter social norms;
 Information, communication, and educational campaigns and tools.

 Limits and challenges 

 The discussion around needs, wants and enoughness 
As it builds on a sense of self and collective moderation in relation to the consumption of energy and material-based services, sufficiency requires drawing a line between wants seen as superfluous and actual justified needs. It triggers potentially complex and contentious theoretical and practical questions. Answers may differ culturally, change with time and context, as well as depend on income and other socio-economic factors.

The issue is not only relevant at the level of individual values, ethics, and lifestyles, but also for public decisions. As an illustration, whereas building or extending an airport was rarely challenged successfully in the past, two recent decisions show this has changed: the decision of the French government to drop the Notre-Dame-des-Landes airport in 2018, and the UK court decision to rule Heathrow’s extension illegal over climate change in 2020.

 Economic impact 
Sufficiency supposes a moderation in the consumption and development of high energy-based and material-based services, which are often delivered by or associated with goods and equipment. Thus, sufficiency means limitations on current consumption levels of some products  and renouncing some types of infrastructures.

A common criticism, shared with the degrowth concept, is that this would hurt economic growth, increase unemployment and lead to social problems. While it is clear that current energy and resource intensive services would be hit by sufficiency, leaner, more local, and employment-intensive activities would also be fostered in the meantime.

There is currently limited research on the macroeconomic impacts of a sufficiency-based society. Notably, there is a lack of understanding of how systematic sufficiency-based business models could be developed and promoted, and how it would change the economic system.

 Rebound effects 
A third objection to sufficiency is that, as for efficiency, the energy and material savings could lead to indirect rebound effects.

This suggests that sufficiency should be implemented as comprehensively as possible, to avoid savings in one sector being annihilated by the growing environmental footprint of another. Capping incomes and resource use are strategies that could mitigate rebound effects.

 Research and projects 
The ENOUGH network (International Network for Sufficiency Research & Policy) has been established in 2018 to bring together scientists and experts from around the world and from various fields working on sufficiency. It aims to increase the visibility of the topic, facilitate networking activities and information sharing, and to act as a resource centre.

Other projects on sufficiency:

 The energy sufficiency project from eceee (European Council for an Energy Efficient Economy) has delivered concept papers on various aspects of sufficiency.
 The 'Sufficiency in daily life' project at the Basel University (2016-2019) explores different aspects of sufficiency as a strategy for a ‘2000 Watt’ society. Consumer habits, everyday routines, and sufficient lifestyles are investigated.
 The 'Living Well Within Limits (LiLi)' project at University of Leeds (2017-?) involves qualitative and modelling approaches to answer three research questions: What are the biophysical resources required to achieve human well-being? What influence do social and technical systems have on the levels of resource use associated with well-being? If remaining within planetary boundaries requires rapid decreases in resource use, how could these scarce resources best be employed to preserve well-being?
 The 'Fair limits' project at University of Utrecht (2017-2022) focuses on ‘Limitarianism''’, i.e. the view that there should be upper limits to how much each person could have of valuable goods. The philosophical argumentation is discussed, as well as what ‘limitarian’ institutions could look like.
 The German 'EnergieSuffizienz' project (2013-2016) investigated several aspects of energy sufficiency in households, urban planning and mobility, such as discussion of sufficiency definitions, development of sufficiency strategies, and recommendations for sufficiency policy packages.
 The French 'Sobriétés' local project in the North of France (2010-2013) aimed at institutionalising energy sufficiency strategies at the regional and local level. It contributed to structuring a network of regional actors who reconsidered regional energy policies under a new light.
 The H2020 ENERGISE project (2017-2019) aimed at reducing household energy usage among 300 households across eight European countries, through a social practice and living lab approach.
 Past and current research on consumption corridors are collected in: https://www.uni-muenster.de/Fuchs/en/forschung/projekte/konsumkorridore.html

References

Ecology
Economics of sustainability